Zina Kalay Kleitman was the Ambassador of Israel to Croatia from 2014 until 2018 and Ukraine from 2007 until 2011.

References

Israeli women ambassadors
Ambassadors of Israel to Croatia
Ambassadors of Israel to Ukraine
Year of birth missing (living people)
Living people